The 42nd Annual Contac 12 Hours of Sebring International Grand Prix of Endurance, was the second round of the 1994 IMSA GT Championship season and was held at the Sebring International Raceway, on 19 March. Victory overall went to the No. 75 Cunningham Racing Nissan 300ZX Turbo driven by John Morton, Johnny O'Connell, and Steve Millen.

Race results
Class Winners are in Bold text.

 Fastest lap: Butch Leitzinger/Paul Gentilozzi, 2:01.047secs.

Class Winners

References

12 Hours of Sebring
12 Hours of Sebring
12 Hours of Sebring
12 Hours of Sebring